Sergio Rafael da Costa  (born September 17, 1985, Brazil), known as Sérgio Rafael, is a Brazilian footballer, who last played for Foolad in the Iran Pro League. He represented the Moldovan side FC Sheriff Tiraspol during the 2009 and 2010 seasons.

External links
Profile at allsoccerplayers.com

1985 births
Living people
Brazilian footballers
Brazilian expatriate footballers
Expatriate footballers in Moldova
Association football defenders
Brazilian expatriate sportspeople in Moldova
FC Sheriff Tiraspol players
Moldovan Super Liga players
Footballers from Curitiba